Vilathikulam taluk is a taluk of Thoothukudi district of the Indian state of Tamil Nadu. The headquarters of the taluk is the town of Vilathikulam.

Demographics
According to the 2011 census, the taluk of Vilathikulam had a population of 140,199 with 69,847  males and 70,352 females. There were 1007 women for every 1000 men. The taluk had a literacy rate of 72.05. Child population in the age group below 6 was 6,644 Males and 6,387 Females.

References 

Taluks of Thoothukudi district